Zsuzsanna Laky (born 17 April 1984 in Nagykanizsa, Zala, Hungary) is a former beauty contestant and Miss Europe 2003.

In 2000 she won the Miss Zala title. After becoming the 1st runner-up of the Miss Hungary beauty contest in 2002, she represented her country at the Miss Europe beauty contest held in Nogent-sur-Marne, France, and was crowned Miss Europe. She became the 2nd Hungarian contestant to do so (the 1st Hungarian Miss Europe was Erzsébet Simon in 1929).

References

1984 births
Living people
Hungarian beauty pageant winners
Miss Europe winners
People from Nagykanizsa